Rytidosperma is a genus of plants in the grass family. Most of the species occur in Australasia, with a few in insular Southeast Asia, southern South America (Chile + Argentina), and certain islands of the Pacific (Hawaii + Easter Island). Several are known by the general common name wallaby grass.

 Species

 formerly included
see Merxmuellera Tenaxia 
 Rytidosperma davyi - Merxmuellera davyi 
 Rytidosperma distichum - Tenaxia disticha
 Rytidosperma grandiflorum - Merxmuellera grandiflora 
 Rytidosperma subulatum - Tenaxia subulata

References

 
Grasses of Asia
Grasses of Oceania
Grasses of South America
Poaceae genera